Oldřich Kaiser (born 16 May 1955) is a Czech television, film, and stage actor known mostly for his comedic roles.

Education and career
Kaiser graduated from the Academy of Performing Arts in Prague in 1978. He began his acting career with theatre performances, working at  Studio Ypsilon in Liberec and later at the National Theatre in Prague. He made his screen debut in Karel Kachyňa's 1973 film Láska.

Together with Jiří Lábus, he formed the comedy duo "Kaiser a Lábus", which took part in such television comedy shows as Možná přijde i kouzelník (1982) and Ruská ruleta (1994).

Personal life and trivia
Between 1980 and 2005, Kaiser was married to Czech actress Naďa Konvalinková, with whom he has a daughter, actress Karolína Kaiserová. In 2020, he married singer Dáša Vokatá.

In 2004, he discovered a new species of ground beetle in Asia with entomologist and neurosurgeon Vladimír Beneš. The insect was subsequently named Cychrus kaiseri, after the actor.

In July 2019, Kaiser survived a heart attack.

Selected filmography

Film

Television

Awards and recognition
 Nominated for Czech Lion Award, Best Actor for I Served the King of England (2007)
 Nominated for Czech Lion Award, Best Supporting Actor for Walking Too Fast (2010)
 Nominated for Czech Lion Award, Best Supporting Actor for Leaving (2011)
 Nominated for Czech Lion Award, Best Supporting Actor for Vendeta (2011)
 Czech Lion Award, Best Actor for A Prominent Patient (2016)
 Czech Lion Award, Best Actor for Po strništi bos (2017)

References

External links

 

Czech male television actors
Czech male film actors
Czech male stage actors
Czech male voice actors
1955 births
Living people
Actors from Liberec
Sun in a Net Awards winners
Academy of Performing Arts in Prague alumni
Czech Lion Awards winners